Spruce Fork is a stream in the U.S. state of West Virginia.

Spruce Fork derives its name from Benjamin Sprouse.

See also
List of rivers of West Virginia

References

Rivers of Boone County, West Virginia
Rivers of Logan County, West Virginia
Rivers of West Virginia